The CUNY School of Labor and Urban Studies (also known as CUNY SLU) is a public undergraduate, graduate, and professional school in New York City associated with the City University of New York system. Founded in 2018 as an outgrowth of the Joseph S. Murphy Institute for Worker Education and Labor Studies, the Murphy Institute is now one of incorporated programs at the School of Labor and Urban Studies, which provides undergraduate and graduate degrees in Labor Studies and Urban Studies, as well as certificate programs and workforce development for members of labor unions. It publishes the journal New Labor Forum.

History
The CUNY School of Labor and Urban Studies was established in 2018 as an outgrowth of the Joseph S. Murphy Institute for Worker Education and Labor Studies, otherwise known as The Murphy Institute. The Murphy Institute was first established in 1984 at Queens College in collaboration with three New York City labor unions for the purposes of providing worker education to labor union members. In 2005, the Murphy Institute was incorporated into the CUNY School of Professional Studies, expanding to provide undergraduate and graduate degrees.

Though New York labor unions had been petitioning for the Murphy Institute to become its own stand-alone school since 2012, when the New York State AFL–CIO passed a resolution endorsing the proposal, it was only until Governor Andrew Cuomo added $1.5 million to the state budget in 2018 that funding was available.

Faculty
Among the faculty include:

 Mimi Abramovitz
 Kafui Attoh
 Juan Battle
 Deepak Bhargava
 Stephen Briar
 Ellen Dichner
 Francis Fox Piven
 Joshua Freeman
 Stephanie Luce
 Ruth Milkman
 John Mollenkopf
 James Steele

References

External links
Official website

2018 establishments in New York City
2010s in Manhattan
Colleges of the City University of New York
Educational institutions established in 2018
Labor studies organizations based in the United States
Midtown Manhattan